Paul Squibb was an American educator who founded Midland School in 1932, a private college preparatory school in California.

Biography
Paul Squibb was born in 29 Dec 1895 in Brooklyn, New York to Charles Fellows Squibb and Margaret Rapelje Dodge Squibb.

Squibb was from Bernardsville, New Jersey. He was the grandson of E. R. Squibb. He graduated from Kent School in 1914 and Harvard University.

Paul Squibb is featured in "Midland Stories 3: Paul Squibb History, one of a series of short videos about the history of Midland School.

After retiring from Midland School, Paul and his wife Louise Groves Squibb retired to Cambria, California.  Mr. Squibb was active in recording the history of Cambria.

Paul Squibb died 10 May 1984 and is buried at Oak Hill Cemetery, Ballard, Santa Barbara County, California.

References

Founders of schools in the United States
Kent School alumni
Harvard University alumni
People from Bernardsville, New Jersey
Year of birth missing
1984 deaths